Ambrose Madden (1820 – 1863) was an Irish VC recipient.

Ambrose Madden may also refer to:
Ambrose Madden (chief) (died  1791), Irish Chief
Ambrose Madden (II) ( c. 1791–1810), Irish Chief
Ambrose Madden (III) (fl. after 1810), Irish Chief